Erythrodiplax unimaculata, also known by its common name white-tailed dragonlet is a species from the genus Erythrodiplax.

Description
This species has wings with brown tips, but female samples often only have basal spots on the wings. Forewings can have a yellowish shadow. For the hind wings the red-yellow color is somewhat more widespread, diffuse anteriorly and not very sharp up to the 1st antenodal transverse artery and on or a little over the transverse artery of the submedian space

Taxonomy
Erythrodiplax unimaculata was first described by Charles De Geer in 1773. Monophyly has not yet been determined

Range
Observation of Erythrodiplax unimaculata have been documented in Brazil, Colombia and Peru. Observations aggregated in the Global Biodiversity Information Facility suggest a more wide spread range in the northern have of South America.

References

Taxa named by Charles De Geer
Fauna of Suriname
Fauna of Guyana
Fauna of Ecuador
Fauna of Peru
Fauna of Bolivia
Fauna of Paraguay
Fauna of French Guiana
Libellulidae